was the pen-name of a Japanese novelist, essayist, poet and literary critic of Korean descent, active during the Shōwa period.

Early life
Tachihara was born in Andong city, Gyeongsangbuk-do province, Korea to Korean parents. His father was a member of the former Korean aristocracy and a military officer serving the Joseon Dynasty, who became a Zen priest after the Japanese annexation of Korea, and subsequently committed suicide when Tachihara was five.

Four years after his father's death in 1931, Tachihara moved with his mother to Yokosuka city, Kanagawa prefecture, Japan. His Korean name was Kim Yun Kyu (金胤奎: 김윤규), but he changed his name to  when his mother married a Japanese man. He has been naturalized in Japan in 1947.

He was a student at Waseda University in Tokyo, and was initially enrolled in the Law Department. However, he gradually shifted over the Literature Department, drawn by his interest in the novels of Yasunari Kawabata and the literary criticism of Hideo Kobayashi.

Tachihara was strongly attracted to medieval Japanese culture, particularly Noh drama, and traditional Japanese gardens, and his novels are patterned after the aesthetics in Zeami's Noh treatise Fushi Kaiden. Tachihara's interests included the collection of ceramics, especially many Korean Yi Dynasty works. It was not until after his death that his Korean ethnic background became widely known.

Literary career
Tachihara's first novel, Bakushū (“Autumn Wheat”) was published in the literary magazine Bungei kenkyūkai. It was well received by literary critics, which led to his decision to become a professional writer. In 1958, he published Tanin no jiyū (“Other People's Freedom”) in the magazine Gunzō, followed by Takigi nō (“Firelight Noh”), Tsurugigasaki (“Cape Tsurugi”) and Urushi no hana (“Lacquer Flower”).

He won the 55th Naoki Award for his novel Shiroi keshi (“White Poppy”, 1965). He also declined the Akutagawa Prize twice, as he felt that the reward would damage his reputation as an author of serious literature.

One of his books, Wind and Stone, has been translated into English by Stephen W. Kohl.

Tachihara lived in Kamakura, Kanagawa prefecture from 1950 until his death of esophageal cancer. Before he died, he officially changed his name to Tachihara Masaaki. His grave is at the temple of Zuisen-ji in Kamakura.

Works in translation
 Cliff's edge, and other stories. Translated by Stephen W. Kohl. Midwest Publishers, 1980. . Contains the following short stories:
 Cliff's edge (Translation of: 剣ヶ崎 Tsurugigasaki)
 The archer (Translation of: 流鏑馬 Yabusame)
 Torchlight nō (Translation of: 薪能 Takiginō)
 Wind and stone. Translated by Stephen W. Kohl. Stone Bridge Press, 1992.  (Translation of: 夢は枯野を Yume wa kareno o)

See also 
 Lee Hoesung, first Zainichi Korean winner of the Akutagawa Prize
 Japanese literature
 List of Japanese authors

References 
 
 Kaneko, Masao. Sokyu to kyosei: Tachihara Masaaki, Yamakawa Masao, Kaiko Takeshi no bungaku. Shiseido (1999). (Japanese)
 Tachihara, Miki. Kaze no yo ni, hikari no yo ni: Chichi Tachihara Masaaki. Kadokawa Shoten (1985).  (Japanese)

Notes

1926 births
1980 deaths
People from Andong
20th-century Japanese novelists
Japanese people of Korean descent
Waseda University alumni
Deaths from esophageal cancer
Deaths from cancer in Japan
Naoki Prize winners